The American Institute of Chemists Gold Medal is the highest award of the American Institute of Chemists and has been awarded since 1926.

It is presented annually to a person who has most encouraged the science of chemistry or the profession of chemist or chemical engineer in the United States of America, giving "exemplary service".

Medal recipients
The following people have received the AIC Gold Medal:

See also

 List of chemistry awards

References

Chemistry awards
Awards established in 1926
American science and technology awards